David Robert Harris (born 24 February 1966) is an Australian politician. He has been a Labor Party member of the New South Wales Legislative Assembly since 2015, representing the electorate of Wyong. He previously represented the same electorate from 2007 to 2011.

Personal life

Harris is one of three children born to his parents who grew up in Greenacre. His parents later moved to the New South Wales Central Coast.

Harris is married to Sherelle and they have two daughters.

Education and teaching career

Harris attended Woy Woy South Public School and Woy Woy High School where became school captain.

Harris undertook tertiary studies and was awarded a Diploma of Teaching and began work in the public school system. He started his career as a teacher at Griffith Public School in 1987. The following year, in his second year of teaching, he became the principal of a one-teacher school at Merriwagga. He moved on to teach at Hillston Central School. It was in Hillston that he met his wife Sherelle.

Harris returned to the New South Wales Central Coast and became principal at Dooralong Public School and then deputy principal at Northlakes Public School.
And Point Clare Public School
Harris was later appointed principal at Gwandalan Public School and finally principal of Kariong Public School.

In 2006 Harris resigned as the principal to pursue a career in politics.

Political career

In 1987 Harris joined the Umina branch of the Labor Party, eventually becoming the president of the Wyong branch and then the secretary of Dobell Federal Electoral Council.

Harris was elected to the New South Wales Legislative Assembly on 24 March 2007 as the Member for Wyong. He was appointed the Parliamentary Secretary for Education and Training and Parliamentary Secretary for the Central Coast. He was also Deputy Chair of the Committee on the Independent Commission Against Corruption and Chair of the Natural Resource Management (Climate Change) Committee. He was a Member of the Staysafe Committee (Joint Standing Committee on Road Safety) and a Member of the Standing Committee on Broadband in Rural and Regional Communities.

At the 2011 state election, Harris lost the seat of Wyong to his Liberal opponent; local small businessman Darren Webber. It was the first time the seat of Wyong had been held by any party other than the Labor Party and the win was a milestone for the Liberals. Harris regained the seat in the 2015 state election.

Return to education and teaching

Late in 2011, Harris was appointed as the new Principal at Point Clare Public School, to begin in the new year. In 2015 he resigned when he decided to run for re-election in Wyong re-winning the seat off Darren Webber.

References

 

1966 births
Living people
Members of the New South Wales Legislative Assembly
Australian Labor Party members of the Parliament of New South Wales
Australian schoolteachers
21st-century Australian politicians